Chaney Willemse (born ) is a South African rugby union player for the  in the Currie Cup and Rugby Challenge. His regular position is flank.

References

South African rugby union players
Living people
1993 births
People from Breede Valley Local Municipality
Rugby union flankers
Boland Cavaliers players
Rugby union players from the Western Cape